Amruka, is a town in Minchinabad tehsil, Bahawalnagar district of Punjab province of the Pakistan.  It is located near Pakistan-India border.

References

Bahawalnagar District